The 9th Annual Interactive Achievement Awards is the 9th edition of the Interactive Achievement Awards, an annual awards event that honors the best games in the video game industry. It was also held as part of the Academy's 2006 D.I.C.E. Summit, and was hosted by Jay Mohr.

God of War received the most nominations and won the most awards, including Overall Game of the Year. Sony Computer Entertainment received the most nominations and won the most awards. This was the third year to feature a tie between finalists. The first time was at the 2nd Awards in 1999, and the second time was at the 7th Awards in 2004.

Richard Garriott also the received the Academy of Interactive Arts & Sciences Hall of Fame Award.

Winners and Nominees
Winners are listed first, highlighted in boldface, and indicated with a double dagger.

Hall of Fame Award
 Richard Garriott

Games with multiple nominations and awards

The following 24 games received multiple nominations:

The following six games received multiple awards:

Companies with multiple nominations

Companies that received multiple nominations as either a developer or a publisher.

Companies that received multiple awards as either a developer or a publisher.

External links
 Archived Winners/Finalists Page

Notes

References

2006 awards
2006 awards in the United States
February 2006 events in the United States
2005 in video gaming
D.I.C.E. Award ceremonies